Henryk Jerzy Kukier (1 January 1930 – 5 December 2020) was a Polish boxer.

Career
Kukier won the gold medal in the Flyweight class at the 1953 European Amateur Boxing Championships in Warsaw, and the bronze medal at the 1955 European Amateur Boxing Championships in West Berlin. Kukier was a Polish champion six times (1953–1957 and 1960). He competed thrice in the Boxing at the Summer Olympics (1952, 1956, 1960). Between 1951 and 1960 he was on the Polish national team and fought 35 times, winning 25 bouts and losing 10.

Death
Kukier was born in Lublin. He died from COVID-19 on 5 December 2020, at age 90, during the COVID-19 pandemic in Poland.

References

External links

1930 births
2020 deaths
Olympic boxers of Poland
Boxers at the 1952 Summer Olympics
Boxers at the 1956 Summer Olympics
Boxers at the 1960 Summer Olympics
Flyweight boxers
Sportspeople from Lublin
Polish male boxers
Deaths from the COVID-19 pandemic in Poland
20th-century Polish people